On 8 November 2021, a classroom in a primary school caught fire in the town of Maradi in southern Niger. As a result, 26 children were killed and more than fourteen were injured.

According to Maradi Governor Chaibou Aboubacar, the fire in three classrooms in the private school killed preschool children between the ages of 5 and 6. Fourteen pupils were also injured in the incident, five of them in critical condition. Aboubacar declared three days of mourning in the country. The cause of the fire is yet to be ascertained. However, the fire spread rapidly as the school building. Niger is one of the poorest countries in the world, school buildings are usually made of weeds and straw.
On 13 April 2021, a school fire in Niamey killed at least 20 pupils.

References

2021 fires in Africa
2021 disasters in Niger
Fires in Niger
School fire
November 2021 events in Africa
School fires